Brickfields Country Park is a park in Aldershot in Hampshire described as one of the smallest country parks in Britain. The park is owned and maintained by Rushmoor Borough Council.

Situated off Boxalls Lane, in Aldershot, Brickfields Country Park was reclaimed from the remains of a Victorian brickworks and clay diggings. Less than eight acres in size, making it one of the smallest country parks in the country, there is a large pond in the centre of the park which supports wildlife and plant life with over 635 species of flora and fauna having been recorded. The park is the venue for an annual family summer event organised by the Friends of Brickfields Country Park.

The car park is signposted off Boxalls Lane, Aldershot, GU11 3QJ.

History

The earliest records regarding the land on which Brickfields Country Park now stands date to about 1175 when the monks of Waverley Abbey were given 31 acres of land for sheep grazing.  Later an additional 29 acres to the east were rented by Adam the Cleric and Margaret of Overscumbe. For around 300 years the land would be worked by one monk assisted by seven clerics and after the Dissolution of the Monasteries it was bought by Robert White of Aldershot.  The two areas of 31 acres and 29 acres were joined into one farm of 60 acres worked until early in the 1600s by John Faunteleroy, then a major landowner in Aldershot. By about 1650 the Boxall family owned the land, but in 1703 Sarah Boxall was in Court in London for non-payment of taxes resulting in the land being divided into small plots of which Boxalls Farm was the largest. 

When the British Army arrived in Aldershot in 1854 there was an immediate and urgent need for brick-built barracks and houses for the rapidly growing Camp and town. The clay for these buildings was dug from several pits in the area, one of them being the pit dug by the newly formed Aldershot Brick and Tile Works on Boxalls Lane. The Victorian brickworks and drying ovens were in use until about 1940 and were located nearby on what is now the Brickfields housing estate. When the brickworks closed the area was used as a concrete works and storage area and latterly as a refuse dump until 1983 when work began to turn the wasteland into a country park as an amenity for the people of Aldershot. The pond was dug out to make it larger and designed to be fed by a storm water drainage ditch in the park. The park was opened on 7 June 1985 by Councillor Colin Balchin, the Mayor of Rushmoor and named Brickfields Country Park following a public competition.

See also
Aldershot Park
Manor Park, Aldershot
Municipal Gardens, Aldershot
Princes Gardens, Aldershot
Rowhill Nature Reserve

References

External links
Brickfields Country Park - Visit South East England
Brickfields Country Park - Visit Hampshire website

Aldershot
Urban public parks
Buildings and structures in Aldershot
Parks and open spaces in Aldershot
Parks and open spaces in Hampshire
Country parks in Hampshire